is a park in Chūō-ku, Niigata, Niigata Prefecture, Japan.

History
The 1964 Niigata earthquake caused the sandy soil under the city to liquefy, damaging many city facilities. The aging baseball stadium was converted to an earthquake memorial using funds from the earthquake disaster relief money. This is currently the Niigata Prefectural Hall.

From the 1990s, aging facilities were demolished. A riverside picnic site covering approximately 7 hectares was created, and north and south bound traffic was diverted under the park via a tunnel.

Other facilities in the park
 Hakusan Shrine
 Niigata Prefectural Government Memorial Hall
 Niigata City Music and Culture Hall
 Niigata-City Performing Arts Center (Ryutopia) 
 Niigata Prefectural Civic Center 
 Niigata City Municipal Gymnasium
 Niigata City Athletic Stadium

External links
  

Parks in Japan
Parks and gardens in Niigata Prefecture
Niigata (city)